Hadizatou Mani (born 1984) is a human rights activist from Niger that fought to free herself from slavery in courts of law.

Life
Mani was born in 1984 in Niger. She had been sold into slavery at the age of twelve for 500 dollars. Slavery is illegal in Niger, but only since 2003, and it is still manifested. She was made to work and to bear three children for her master. He claimed that she was his wife and not his slave. As a result, he accused her of bigamy when she married another man. Mani was sent to jail for six months but she was encouraged to appeal her case.

After she used the courts to overturn her conviction she was given $20,000 in damages and later honored with the 2009 International Women of Courage Award. She was on Time Magazine's 2009 list of the world's 100 most influential people and was honored as one of the BBC 100 Women in December 2022.

References

Living people
1984 births
Recipients of the International Women of Courage Award
BBC 100 Women